Ultra Naté Wyche (born March 20, 1968) is an American singer, songwriter, record producer, DJ and promoter who has achieved success on the pop charts with songs such as "Free", "If You Could Read My Mind" (as part of Stars on 54), and "Automatic".

Virtually all of her singles have reached the Top 10 of the US Hot Dance Club Play chart. Such singles include "Show Me", "Free", "Desire", "Get It Up (the Feeling)", "Love's the Only Drug", and her number-one hits "Automatic", "Give it All You Got" featuring Chris Willis, "Waiting On You" and "Everybody Loves the Night". In December 2016, Billboard magazine ranked her as the 12th most successful dance artist of all-time.

Biography

Early life
Born Ultra Naté in Havre de Grace, Maryland, United States, she displayed her singing talent at an early age. Growing up, Naté enjoyed a wide variety of music; she enjoyed listening to artists such as Marvin Gaye and Boy George, who Naté later said helped her become more open to being more experimental with her style and production of music.

She is best known in her home country for her 1990s dance crossover track, "Free". She is also remembered in America for her team-up with Amber and Jocelyn Enriquez as Stars on 54 on a 1998 cover of Gordon Lightfoot's "If You Could Read My Mind", which was a minor mainstream American hit. It reached #52 on the Billboard Hot 100 chart and #3 on the Billboard Hot Dance Music/Club Play chart. Though she has had club success in America, she has found the majority of her singles and, especially, album sales success in Europe.

Career
Ultra Naté began her recording career on a major label, Warner Bros. Records, signed through its British offices. Through it, she released her first two albums. Her debut album, Blue Notes in the Basement (1991) was created along with the Basement Boys and it featured the singles "It's Over Now", "Deeper Love (Missing You)", "Is It Love", and the gospel-tinged "Rejoicing".

In 1993, the alternative dance/house One Woman's Insanity was released. Although it still featured the Basement Boys' production on several tracks, this time Ultra found herself working with Nellee Hooper, and D-Influence. At a time when soulful house music performers such as Robin S and Crystal Waters were scoring cross-over Top Ten Pop singles, it was believed that Ultra Naté would score a similar level of commercial success. Mainstream sales however were not achieved even though "Show Me" received moderate mainstream pop radio airplay. Singles included "How Long", "Show Me" (her first song to reach the top position on the US Dance charts) and "Joy". However, neither release sold very well, and she was dropped from the label.

In 1995, Ultra Naté contributed the song "Party Girl (Turn Me Loose)" to the soundtrack to the independent film starring Parker Posey. The single was commercially released by the King Street Sounds label.

When Warner Bros. tried to push her in another direction, Ultra Naté left the major label and moved to the independent dance label, Strictly Rhythm. It was here that "Free", her biggest mainstream hit, was released in 1997. The song, co-written by Naté, Lem Springsteen and John Ciafone while production was held by both Springsteen and Ciafone, enjoyed heavy airplay throughout the summer, not only in clubs, but on rhythmic and mainstream radio stations in America and Europe. "Free" peaked at number 75 on the US Billboard Hot 100. It became a substantial hit in the United Kingdom, where it peaked at number four on the UK Singles Chart, helping its parent album 'Situation: Critical' reach number seventeen on the UK Albums Chart. 
It was also successful in Canada, where it peaked at number ten on the Canadian Singles Chart.

It was with this album that Ultra Naté's greatest commercial success was achieved, particularly in Europe, where singles such as "Found a Cure" (No. 6 in the UK), and "New Kind of Medicine" (No 14 UK) also charted.

In 1998, a new single "Pressure" was released internationally. Taken from the soundtrack to the film The 24 Hour Woman, it contained three club mixes. The original version of the track was found on 'Situation: Critical" but listed as "Release the Pressure".

Her follow-up album Stranger Than Fiction, which was released in 2001, featured the production work of artists such as Attica Blues, 4 Hero, and Mood II Swing. Four singles were released: "Desire", "Get It Up (The Feeling)", "Twisted", and "I Don't Understand It".

Naté contributed the song "Wonderful Place" to the AIDS benefit compilation Keep Hope Alive: A Lifebeat Benefit Compilation. Additionally, in 2004, she released the singles "Feel Love", "Brass in Pocket", "Time of Our Lives" (released as "Ultra Devoted featuring Ultra Naté and Gerry DeVeaux"), and a new version of "Free" that features twelve new mixes. In 2005, she collaborated with Gaudino and released the single "Bitter Sweet Melody". Later in the same year she found herself again on the charts, when her featured vocals on the Stonebridge single "Freak On" became a successful dance hit. She also performed on the British show Hit Me Baby One More Time.

Having become a mother for the first time in the fall of 2005, Naté released her fifth album Grime, Silk, & Thunder on her newly created imprint Blufire in partnership with Tommy Boy Records. The first single released was "Love's the Only Drug", which became available through the US iTunes Store August 8, 2006 and reached number two on the American Hot Dance Club Play and made the Top 30 on the Hot Dance Airplay chart. The second single "Automatic" (a cover version of the Pointer Sisters hit) reached number one on the US Hot Dance Club Play chart (the week ending April 28, 2007). It also received airplay in the Rhythmic/Dance format radio where it reached the Top 30 of most playlists in this radio format. Following Automatic, Ultra released "Give It All You Got" which features Chris Willis in Dec 2007. The song hit No. 1 on the Billboard Dance Music/Club Play charts the week ending February 23, 2008.

In mid-2009 it was announced that US singer Michelle Williams, previously of Destiny's Child has collaborated on a song with Ultra called "I'm Waiting On You", for use on both of their next studio albums. In 2010 Ultra has released a Bob Sinclar remix of her hit "Free" on Strictly Rhythm. "Give It 2 U" in collaboration with Quentin Harris for his album "Sacrifice". She also released "Destination" in collaboration with Tony Moran which peaked at No. 10 on the Billboard Dance Play chart. "Destination" was the second single off Tony's album, Mix Magic Music.

In 2010 she released an EP titled "Things Happen At Night" featuring Ultra's pop and soul melodies and vocals over percussive club beats done by Unruly productions. January 2011 is saw the release of Ultra's next single with Strictly Rhythm on her Deep Sugar label imprint called "Turn It Up" with a music video directed by Leo Herrera. "Turn It Up" was the first single to be released from her sixth studio album titled Hero Worship.

In September 2011, she submitted the song, "My Love" to represent Switzerland in the Eurovision Song Contest 2012, to be held in Baku, Azerbaijan. However, though close, the song failed to reach the final.

In 2013, she held a residency spot at Cafe Ole at Space, Ibiza. Her spirited presence has graced the stages of New York's massive Summer Stage in Central Park, Nile Rodgers acclaimed FOLD Festival sharing the stage with the likes of CHIC, Duran Duran, Pharrell and Beck to Lincoln Center's annual Midnight Summer Swing and numerous Pride events around the world.

Ultra's 2017 album collaboration, Ultra Naté & Quentin Harris as Black Stereo Faith, reached the iTunes Top 10 upon release.

Awards and nominations

{| class="wikitable sortable plainrowheaders" 
|-
! scope="col" | Award
! scope="col" | Year
! scope="col" | Category
! scope="col" | Nominee(s)
! scope="col" | Result
! scope="col" class="unsortable"| 
|-
! scope="row" rowspan=3|Billboard Music Awards 
| 1997
| rowspan=2|Top Hot Dance Club Play Single
| "Free"
| 
|
|-
| rowspan=2|1998
| "Found a Cure"
| 
| rowspan=2|
|-
| Top Hot Dance Club Play Artist
| Herself
| 
|-
! scope="row" rowspan=5|International Dance Music Awards
| rowspan=3|1998
| Best Dance Solo Artist
| Herself
| 
| rowspan=3|
|-
| Best House/Garage 12"
| rowspan=2|"Free"
| 
|-
| Best Pop 12" Dance Record
| 
|-
| 2008
| Best Dance Solo Artist
| Herself
| 
|
|-
| 2011
| Best House/Garage Dance Track 
| "Give It 2 U"
| 
|

Discography

Albums

Studio albums

Compilation albums
The Best Remixes, Vol. 1 (1997)
Best Remixes, Vol. 2 (1999)
Alchemy - G.S.T. Reloaded (2008)

Extended plays
Things Happen at Night (2010)

Singles

As featured artist

See also
List of number-one dance hits (United States)
List of artists who reached number one on the US Dance chart

References

External links
 Ultra Naté — official website

1968 births
Living people
People from Havre de Grace, Maryland
African-American women singer-songwriters
American garage house musicians
American house musicians
American contemporary R&B singers
Warner Records artists
Tommy Boy Records artists
AM PM Records artists
American dance musicians
Singer-songwriters from Maryland
Deep house musicians
American women in electronic music
20th-century African-American women singers
21st-century African-American women singers